Glorantha: Genertela, Crucible of the Hero Wars is a supplement created by Chaosium and published under license by Avalon Hill in 1988 for the fantasy role-playing game RuneQuest.

Contents
Glorantha: Genertela, Crucible of the Hero Wars is a campaign setting describing the continent of Genertela in the fantasy world of Glorantha. The components of the boxed set are:
 40-page booklet "Glorantha", covers the history of Glorantha
 100-page booklet "Genertela", covers the continent of Genertela, broken down into regions, listing inhabitants, culture, form of government, common languages, armies, and religions. It also includes encounter tables for common, uncommon and rare events in each region.
 36-page "Player's Book", recommends four good starting points and societies for players
 a large two-color map of the continent

Publication history
Chaosium first published RuneQuest in 1977. In 1984, seeking a wider distribution and marketing, Chaosium licensed Avalon Hill to create and produce the third edition of RuneQuest. However, Chaosium did not include the setting of Glorantha in the license unless the content was either created or approved by Chaosium staff. As a result, RuneQuest material created by Avalon Hill was usually set in the more generic Fantasy Earth setting.  

In keeping with this policy, Glorantha: Genertela, Crucible of the Hero Wars was created in 1988 by Chaosium staff (written by Greg Stafford, Sandy Petersen, and William Dunn, with a cover by Steve Purcell, and illustrations by Kevin Ramos), but was published under license by Avalon Hill as a boxed set.

Reception
In the January 1989 edition of Games International (Issue 2), John Scott was pleasantly surprised by the large amount of content in this boxed set, saying, "I didn't expect much from this pack when I opened it, but I am a convert now!" He concluded by giving it a perfect rating of 5 out of 5, commenting, "This is RuneQuest as it was meant to be. Start saving now — you gotta get this pack!"

In the September 1990 edition of Dragon (Issue #161), Jim Bambra admired the sheer amount of content in this boxed set. He called the history book "first class", and noted how major events were often described from several different viewpoints, commenting that "This divergency adds greatly to the mythic content of Glorantha, making it fascinating and very credible." Bambra also complimented the "Genertela" book, saying, "The variety of cultures and societies covered is very impressive, reflecting the years of careful thought and development that as gone into creating Glorantha." However, although Bambra thought this boxed set "is a very impressive product", he felt that "to be used effectively, the Gods of Glorantha supplement is needed; without it, the deities of Glorantha remain little more than a collection of names, but with it Glorantha comes to life." Bambra concluded with a strong recommendation, saying, "Whether you play the RuneQuest game or another system, Glorantha is a world to study and marvel at for its complexity and detail. Players of the RuneQuest game have cause for celebration and more than a little smugness in knowing that the one of the greatest campaign worlds has been designed for them."

References

Role-playing game supplements introduced in 1988
RuneQuest 3rd edition supplements